Robert Vrečer (born 8 October 1980) is a Slovenian former professional road racing cyclist, who rode professionally between 2006 and 2014 for the , , , , and  teams.

Following a positive clomifene control, Vrečer was suspended, for twenty months, on 30 July 2014.

Major results
Sources:

2008
9th Trofeo Zsšdi
2009
2nd GP Kranj
10th Trofeo Zsšdi
2010
1st  Overall Istrian Spring Trophy
1st Prologue & Stage 2
1st  Overall Tour de Slovaquie
1st Stages 4 & 5
8th Trofeo Zsšdi
2011
1st  Overall Szlakiem Grodów Piastowskich
1st  Overall Istrian Spring Trophy
1st Prologue & Stage 2
 National Road Championships
2nd Time trial
7th Road race
3rd Overall Tour of Slovenia
1st Prologue
2012
 National Road Championships
1st  Time trial
7th Road race
1st  Overall Tour of Greece
1st Stage 1
2nd Gran Premio Nobili Rubinetterie
3rd Overall Tour of Austria
3rd Duo Normand (with Andreas Hofer)
2013
Tour de Suisse
1st  Mountains classification
1st  Sprints classification

References

External links

Cycling Base: Robert Vrečer
Cycling Quotient: Robert Vrečer
Euskaltel-Euskadi: Robert Vrečer

1980 births
Living people
Slovenian male cyclists
Slovenian sportspeople in doping cases
Doping cases in cycling
Sportspeople from Celje